The Department of Rural Development and Panchayat Raj of state of Tamil Nadu is one of the Department of Government of Tamil Nadu

Sub - Departments

Additional Works Allocated

Undertakings & Bodies

Ministers for Rural Development and Panchayat Raj

See also 
 Government of Tamil Nadu
 Tamil Nadu Government's Departments
 Ministry of Micro, Small and Medium Enterprises
 Department of Finance (Kerala)

References

External links 
 http://www.tn.gov.in/departments/rd.html (Official Website of the Rural Development and Panchayat Raj Department, Tamil Nadu -1)
 http://www.tnrd.gov.in/ (Official Website of the Rural Development and Panchayat Raj Department, Tamil Nadu - 2)
 http://www.tn.gov.in (Official website of Government of Tamil Nadu)
 http://www.tn.gov.in/rti/proact_rural.htm (Tamil Nadu Rural Development and Panchayat Raj Department RTI)

Tamil Nadu state government departments
Economy of Tamil Nadu
Rural development organisations in India
1811 establishments in India